Bala is a town and community in Gwynedd, Wales. Formerly an urban district, Bala lies in the historic county of Merionethshire, at the north end of Bala Lake. According to the 2021 Census, Bala had a population of 1,999 and 72.5 per cent of the population could speak Welsh with a decrease of 6% since 2011.

Toponym
The Welsh word bala refers to the outflow of a lake.

History

Tomen Y Bala ( high by  diameter) is a tumulus or "moat-hill", formerly thought to mark the site of a Roman camp.

In the 18th century, the town was well known for the manufacture of flannel, stockings, gloves and hosiery.

The large stone-built theological college, Coleg y Bala, of the Calvinistic Methodists and the grammar school (now Ysgol y Berwyn), which was founded in 1712, are the chief features, together with the statue of the Rev. Thomas Charles (1755–1814), the theological writer, to whom was largely due the foundation of the British and Foreign Bible Society.

The scarcity of the Bible, along with the determination of Mary to get one (she had saved for six years), was a major factor in the foundation of the British and Foreign Bible Society in 1804.

Betsi Cadwaladr, who worked with Florence Nightingale in the Crimea, and who gave her name to the Health Board, came from Bala. Other famous people from the Bala area include Michael D. Jones, Christopher Timothy, Owen Morgan Edwards, born in Llanuwchllyn, and T.E. Ellis, born in Cefnddwysarn.

Bala hosted the National Eisteddfod in 1967, 1997 and 2009. The 2009 Eisteddfod was notable because the chair was not awarded to any of the entrants as the standard was deemed to be too low.  Bala hosted the Eisteddfod Genedlaethol yr Urdd Gobaith Cymru, National Eisteddfod for the Welsh League of Youth, in 2014. On 16 June 2016, Bala's name was changed to Bale temporarily in honour of Real Madrid forward Gareth Bale. This was only for the duration of UEFA Euro 2016.

Twinning
Bala, Ontario, Canada, was named after the town in 1868. They have become twin towns.

Demographics

Languages 
According to the United Kingdom Census 2021, 72.5 per cent of all usual residents aged 3+ in Bala can speak Welsh.

The 2011 census noted 78.5 per cent of all usual residents aged 3 years and older in the town could speak Welsh. The Welsh-language skills of Bala residents were as follows in 2011 and 2021:

Identity 
According to the 2011 Census, 70.5 per cent of the population noted that they had Welsh-only national identity, with 22.2 per cent noting that they had no Welsh national identity at all. According to the 2022 Census, 64.8 per cent of the population noted that they had Welsh-only national identity.

Geography
At , its depths could hide the tower of St Giles Church in Wrexham and still have  of water above. The lake has occasionally been known to freeze over, most recently in the severe winters of 1947 and 1963. The rare Gwyniad fish—trapped in the lake at the end of the last ice age, some 10,000 years ago—is in danger because its natural home is increasingly unsuitable. A member of the whitefish family, it is found only in the lake.

Cwm Hirnant, a valley running south from Bala, gives its name to the Hirnantian Age in the Ordovician Period of geological time.

Nearby villages include Llanfor, Llandderfel, Llanycil, Llangower, Llanuwchllyn, Rhyd-uchaf and Rhos-y-gwaliau.

Climate
As with the rest of the UK, Bala benefits from a maritime climate, with limited seasonal temperature ranges, and generally moderate rainfall throughout the year.

Attractions

The Afon Tryweryn, a river fed from Llyn Celyn which runs through Bala, is world-famous for its white water kayaking. International governing bodies, the International Canoe Federation, the European Canoe Union and the British Canoe Union all hold national and international events there. The Canolfan Tryweryn National Whitewater Centre has its home in Bala. There are at least three local campsites that cater for the influx of canoeists from many parts of the world.

An annual music festival known as 'Wa Bala' is also held in the town. The venue hosts local Welsh bands and is similar in format to Dolgellau's Sesiwn Fawr.

Nearby are the mountains Aran Fawddwy and Arenig Fawr.

Coleg y Bala is at the top of the hill on the road towards Llyn Celyn. The Victoria Hall is a small old cinema, that had been a community hall. There are several chapels: notably Capel Mawr and Capel Bach. The livestock market on Arenig Street is still going strong. Bro Eryl estate was built just after World War II. Mary Jones World, a heritage centre about Mary Jones and her Bible is located just outside the town in nearby Llanycil.

Bala Town Hall, which now operates as a restaurant, dates back to circa 1800.

Transport 

Bala has been served by various railway stations on the Great Western Railway:
Bala Lake Halt railway station was Bala's first station, on the Bala and Dolgelly Railway (open 1868 to 1882; 1934 to 1939)
Bala (Penybont) railway station is the name of the Bala Lake heritage railway's station on the site of the Bala Lake Halt
Bala (New) railway station - Bala's second station, on the Festiniog and Blaenau Railway (open 1882 to 1965)
Bala Junction railway station - The meeting point of the Bala and Dolgellau Railway, Corwen and Bala Railway and the Bala and Festiniog Railway (open 1882 to 1965)

It terminates at Bala (Penybont) railway station, which opened in 1976 on the site of the former Lake Halt station. As of 2020, work is being undertaken to extend the line along the lake foreshore to a new station in the town center.

Bus services are provided by Lloyds Coaches, as part of the Welsh Government funded TrawsCymru network. Services operate westbound to Barmouth via Dolgellau, and eastbound to Wrexham via Corwen and Llangollen. Through ticketing is available for onward connections at Dolgellau, to Bangor, Machynlleth and Aberystwyth.

The town lies on the A494, a major trunk road that leads to Dolgellau, 18 miles to the southwest, and to Ruthin, Mold and Queensferry to the northwest. The A4212 starts in the town, and crosses the Migneint to Trawsfynydd. Heading southeast, the B4391 crosses the Berwyn range to the English border and the town of Oswestry.

Sport

Bala is home to Cymru Premier football club Bala Town F.C. who play at Maes Tegid. Bala's local rugby club is Bala RFC.

Notable people

 Thomas Charles (1755 – 1814 in Bala), a Welsh Calvinistic Methodist clergyman.
 Betsi Cadwaladr (1789–1860), nurse, eponym for Betsi Cadwaladr University Health Board
 Michael D. Jones (1822 in Llanuwchlyn – 1898), a Welsh Congregationalist minister, principal of Bala theological college, a founder of the Welsh settlement in Patagonia and one of the fathers of modern Welsh nationalism
 John Hugh Jones (1843–1910) a Welsh Roman Catholic priest, translator and tutor.
 Richard John Lloyd Price (1843–1923), squire, journalist, author and judge at field trials
 T. E. Ellis (1859–1899), politician and leader of Cymru Fydd 
 Robert Thomas Jenkins CBE (1881–1969), historian and academic, brought up in Bala.
 Jack Evans (1889–1971), footballer, played 354 games for Cardiff City F.C.
 Christopher Timothy (born 1940), actor

Gallery

See also
Bala Series of geologic beds in Bala
Bala Cynwyd, Pennsylvania
Bala Town F.C., local football team.
Bala RFC, local rugby union club.

References

External links

Bala information
www.geograph.co.uk : photos of Bala and surrounding area

 
Towns in Gwynedd